At least two ships of the French Navy have borne the name Bayard in honour of Pierre Terrail, seigneur de Bayard:

Ships named Bayard 
 , a  90-gun ship of the line
  (1880), a station battleship of the French Navy, lead ship of her class

Notes and references

Notes

References

Bibliography 
 

French Navy ship names